Gary Liddell (27 August 1954 – 29 April 2015) was a Scottish professional footballer who played as a striker. Active in both England and Scotland between 1972 and 1983, Liddell made over 150 career League appearances.

Career
Born in Stirling, Liddell played for Leeds United, Grimsby Town, Hearts and Doncaster Rovers.

Personal life
His son Andy was also a professional footballer.

References

1954 births
2015 deaths
Scottish footballers
Leeds United F.C. players
Grimsby Town F.C. players
Heart of Midlothian F.C. players
Doncaster Rovers F.C. players
English Football League players
Scottish Football League players
Footballers from Stirling
Association football forwards